Friuli-Venezia Giulia is a constituency (Italian: Circoscrizione) for the Chamber of Deputies and the Senate. It elects 13 members and 7 members, with the Rosatellum,  via proportionality and first-past-the-post. Its territory is the region Friuli-Venezia Giulia.

Chamber of Deputies

2018

General results (Proportional+FPTP)

First-past-the-post results 
 Elected in the Centre-right coalition

Proportional results

2022

General results (Proportional+FPTP)

First-past-the-post results

Proportional results

Senate

2018

General results (Proportional+FPTP)

First-past-the-post results 
 Elected in the Centre-right coalition

Proportional results

2022

General results (Proportional+FPTP)

First-past-the-post results

Proportional results

References

Politics of Friuli-Venezia Giulia
Constituencies established in 1994
Chamber of Deputies constituencies in Italy
Senate constituencies in Italy